The , formerly referred to as  is a Japanese governmental organization and is the largest national organization of taiko performance groups active in Japan.  As of 2012, the Foundation represents over 800 taiko groups, approximately 20,000 individuals, and is made up of 34 leagues corresponding to some Japanese prefectures.

History
The predecessor to the current Nippon Taiko Foundation was founded in 1979 by Daihachi Oguchi, the developer of contemporary taiko performance.  Generally, membership in this organization only included groups that Oguchi had taught or trained.  The group had two goals:  to develop productive relations with active taiko groups, and to publicize and teach taiko performance techniques.

Membership in the Foundation increased substantially in the 1980s.  There were few experienced teachers who were available to teach newer members, and prompted concerns from organizational leadership that it would not be feasible to accommodate demand, particularly because taiko was normally taught orally.  To resolve this problem, Oguchi developed a textbook called  that was published in 1994.  However, leadership at the Foundation were not satisfied with the publication because they felt it was written too heavily in favor of Oguchi's specific performance methods, and that it lacked a general set of fundamental performance techniques that would allow for an organized certification process.  The Foundation later published a more recent textbook in 2001 called the  that provides a set of basic techniques, such as how to hold a percussion mallet and suggested stretching methods to prepare for performance.  The textbook has been revised and was republished in 2006.

Membership

The Foundation has generally been recognized for its work in connecting taiko performance groups across Japan and internationally.　As of 2012, the Foundation represents over 800 taiko groups, approximately 20,000 individuals, and is made up of 34 leagues corresponding to some Japanese prefectures.  It also has a membership of over 8000 certified instructors of taiko performance at various levels both within and outside Japan.

References

Citations

Bibliography

Cultural organizations based in Japan
1997 establishments in Japan